Awaous flavus is a species of goby native to fresh and brackish waters of rivers and estuaries of South America from Colombia to near the mouth of the Amazon River in Brazil.  Males of this species can reach a length of  SL while females only reach  SL.

References

External links
 Photograph

flavus
Fish of South America
Fauna of South America
Fish described in 1837